The 50th International Film Festival of India was held from 20 to 28 November 2019 in Goa. Russia is the country of focus with eight Russian language films being screened.

Jury

 John Bailey, Chairperson
 Robin Campillo, French screenwriter, editor and film director
 Zhang Yang, Chinese film director, screenwriter
 Lynne Ramsay, Scottish film director, writer, producer, and cinematographer
 Ramesh Sippy, Indian director

Winners
Golden Peacock (Best Film): Particles by Blaise Harrison
IFFI Best Director Award: Lijo Jose Pellissery for Jallikattu
IFFI Best Debut Director Award: Amin Sidi-Boumédiène for Abou Leila and Marius Olteanu for Monsters.
IFFI Best Actor Award (Male): Seu Jorge for Marighella
IFFI Best Actor Award (Female): Usha Jadhav for Mai Ghat : Crime No 103/2015
Silver Peacock Special Jury Award: Pema Tseden for Balloon
Special Mention: Hellaro by Abhishek Shah

Special awards
Life Time Achievement Award - Isabelle Hupert
ICFT UNESCO Gandhi Medal: Riccardo Salvetti for Rwanda
ICFT UNESCO Gandhi Medal (Special mention): Sanjay Puran Singh for Bahattar Hoorain
IFFI Golden Jubilee ICON Award: Rajinikanth

Official Selections

Opening Film
 Despite the Fog (Italy)

Closing Film
Marghe and Her Mother (Italy)

See also
 List of film festivals in India
 52nd International Film Festival of India

References

External links
 

2019 film festivals
2019 festivals in Asia
50
2019 in Indian cinema